Voroshilovsky District is the name of several districts in Russia. The districts are named for Kliment Voroshilov, a Soviet military commander and statesman.

City divisions 
 Voroshilovsky City District, Rostov-on-Don, a city district of Rostov-on-Don, the administrative center of Rostov Oblast
 Voroshilovsky City District, Volgograd, a city district of Volgograd, the administrative center of Volgograd Oblast

Renamed districts 
 Voroshilovsky District, name of Usolsky District of Perm Oblast (now Perm Krai) in 1940–1957

See also 
 Voroshilovsky (disambiguation)

References